Murowaniec may refer to the following places:
Murowaniec, Gmina Koźminek in Greater Poland Voivodeship (west-central Poland)
Murowaniec, Kuyavian-Pomeranian Voivodeship (north-central Poland)
Murowaniec, Masovian Voivodeship (east-central Poland)
Murowaniec, Gmina Szczytniki in Greater Poland Voivodeship (west-central Poland)
Murowaniec, Pomeranian Voivodeship (north Poland)